Pola Petrenko (born 28 September 1997), is a French actress and model.

Beginnings and education 
Pola Petrenko was born in Paris, to a French businessman father and a Russian mother, a journalist and director. From the age of four, Pola became a model for artistic photos. At the age of five, she entered the Stanlowa Ballet School in Paris, took acting classes from the age of eight at Studio Maria, then at the Cours Florent in Paris until 2014. She obtained a degree in cinema at Sorbonne Nouvelle University Paris 3.

Career 
In 2020, she joined the cast of the daily series Ici tout commence, broadcast on TF1 playing the role of Charlene Teyssier.

Filmography

Advertising 

 2016 : Monaco Yacht Show
 2017 : Asus
 2017 : 20 years of IXINA, TF1
 2017 : La Modeuse, TV spot M6
 2018 : La Modeuse, TV spot
 2018: Dragon Quest

Dubbing 
 2009: The Imaginarium of Doctor Parnassus (film): Olga

Film and television 
 2015: Testament (short film): Josephine
 2017: The Creature (short film) : the creature
 2018: The Elixir Pact (short film): Sophie
 2018: Missing Misses on Canal+
 2019: Good luck Mr Gorsky : Natalia
 Since 2020: Ici tout commence on TF1: Charlène Teyssier
 2021: Serial Écolo (short film): country guard

References

External links 
 
 

1997 births
21st-century French actresses
21st-century French women
Living people
People from Paris
French people of Russian descent